Chevrolet has produced full sized pickup trucks under many nameplates and platforms. Almost all Chevrolet branded vehicles were also available under the GMC brand as well.

Full-size pickup trucks

Pre-1960 models

Chevrolet C/K
The Chevrolet C/K is a line of pickup trucks and other vehicles manufactured by Chevrolet from 1960 to 2002. It was discontinued and replaced by the Chevrolet Silverado.

Chevrolet Silverado
Introduced in 1999, the Chevrolet Silverado replaced the Chevrolet C/K as Chevrolet's flagship line of pickup trucks.

Chevrolet Avalanche
The Chevrolet Avalanche was manufactured for twelve years from 2001 to 2013, producing two generations in its lifespan.

Mid-size pickup trucks
Chevrolet has also sold or produced many compact/mid-size pickup trucks:

Passenger car based pickup trucks
Chevrolet has also produced pickup trucks based on passenger cars:

See also
List of Chevrolet vehicles

Notes

References

Pickup trucks
Truck-related lists